The Harvard Radcliffe Chorus (HRC) is the largest mixed choir at Harvard University and has a diverse membership consisting of faculty members, staff, community members, and both undergraduate and graduate students.  HRC was founded in 1979 and continues to perform twice a year as of 2018.  HRC usually performs its master concerts at Sanders Theatre at Harvard University, one of the many venues in the Boston area with high-quality acoustics.  When a large pipe organ is required for a masterwork, such as Berlioz's Te Deum, the chorus performs in a large church in Cambridge, Massachusetts.

History 
The Harvard–Radcliffe Chorus (HRC) was founded in 1979 by Beverly Taylor as the Harvard-Radcliffe Chorale with about forty undergraduates and a few staff members who wanted to sing. It was conceived with Dr. Jameson Marvin, Director of Choral Activities at Harvard University, as a training choir for students who needed more choral experience to perform with the other Harvard Choruses:  the Harvard Glee Club, the Radcliffe Choral Society, and the Harvard-Radcliffe Collegium Musicum, and as an organization that invited communities in the greater Boston-Cambridge area to come sing at Harvard.

In 1980, the Chorale was renamed the Harvard–Radcliffe Chorus. Under the leadership of Beverly Taylor until 1995, HRC student and community membership increased dramatically, and the Chorus continued to prosper under the direction of Jeffrey Bernstein during the 1995–96 season.

From 1996 to 2004, Dr. Constance DeFotis helped make HRC a choral home to a diverse group of students, faculty, staff, and members of the Greater Boston community. Dr. DeFotis also oversaw the founding of the Executive Committee, the self-governing group of student and community officers that addresses the chorus’s non-artistic concerns and administrative matters.  While she was on leave during the 2002–2003 academic year, Simon Carrington led the Chorus. From 2004 to 2012, Dr. Kevin Leong led the Chorus as Artistic Director and as Associate Conductor of the Harvard–Radcliffe Choruses. The ensemble's current Conductor and Artistic Director is Edward Elwyn Jones, the Gund University Organist and Choirmaster at Harvard University.  Michael Pfitzer serves as Assistant Conductor and Manager.

Previous and current repertoire is listed below:

Harvard University musical groups
Musical groups established in 1969
University choirs